The  Meralco Bolts season was the 11th season of the franchise in the Philippine Basketball Association (PBA).

Key dates
March 14: The PBA Season 46 draft was held at the TV5 Media Center in Mandaluyong.

Draft picks

Roster

Philippine Cup

Eliminations

Standings

Game log

|-bgcolor=ccffcc
| 1
| July 16
| NorthPort
| W 85–63
| Mac Belo (27)
| Mac Belo (9)
| Almazan, Quinto (5)
| Ynares Sports Arena
| 1–0
|-bgcolor=ccffcc
| 2
| July 18
| San Miguel
| W 93–87
| Chris Newsome (17)
| Bong Quinto (7)
| Newsome, Quinto (6)
| Ynares Sports Arena
| 2–0
|-bgcolor=ffcccc
| 3
| July 24
| Rain or Shine
| L 72–85
| Chris Newsome (13)
| Cliff Hodge (12)
| Chris Newsome (6)
| Ynares Sports Arena
| 2–1
|-bgcolor=ccffcc
| 4
| July 28
| Phoenix
| W 91–80
| Allein Maliksi (24)
| Belo, Hodge, Maliksi (7)
| Chris Newsome (7)
| Ynares Sports Arena
| 3–1
|-bgcolor=ccffcc
| 5
| July 31
| Alaska
| W 89–80
| John Pinto (16)
| Chris Newsome (11)
| Chris Newsome (6)
| Ynares Sports Arena
| 4–1

|-bgcolor=ccffcc
| 6
| September 1
| Magnolia
| W 95–94
| Mac Belo (22)
| Cliff Hodge (11)
| Chris Newsome (4)
| DHVSU Gym
| 5–1
|-bgcolor=ffcccc
| 7
| September 3
| TNT
| L 76–91
| John Pinto (16)
| Reynel Hugnatan (11)
| Bong Quinto (5)
| DHVSU Gym
| 5–2
|-bgcolor=ccffcc
| 8
| September 1
| Terrafirma
| W 95–83
| Bong Quinto (17)
| Almazan, Pasaol, Quinto (8)
| John Pinto (7)
| DHVSU Gym
| 6–2
|-bgcolor=ccffcc
| 9
| September 18
| Blackwater
| W 104–97
| Allein Maliksi (21)
| Raymond Almazan (17)
| Bong Quinto (6)
| DHVSU Gym
| 7–2
|-bgcolor=ccffcc
| 10
| September 22
| NLEX
| W 104–101
| Allein Maliksi (22)
| Raymond Almazan (11)
| Bong Quinto (8)
| DHVSU Gym
| 8–2
|-bgcolor=ccffcc
| 11
| September 23
| Barangay Ginebra
| W 79–66
| Belo, Pasaol (15)
| Raymond Almazan (10)
| Bong Quinto (8)
| DHVSU Gym
| 9–2

Playoffs

Bracket

Game log

|-bgcolor=ffcccc
| 1
| September 29
| NLEX
| L 80–81
| Allein Maliksi (16)
| Cliff Hodge (11)
| Newsome, Quinto (4)
| DHVSU Gym
| 0–1
|-bgcolor=ccffcc
| 2
| October 1
| NLEX
| W 97–86
| Chris Newsome (23)
| Hodge, Newsome (9)
| Caram, Newsome (6)
| DHVSU Gym
| 1–1

|-bgcolor=ffcccc
| 1
| October 3
| Magnolia
| L 79–88
| Bong Quinto (14)
| Cliff Hodge (8)
| Bong Quinto (10)
| DHVSU Gym
| 0–1
|-bgcolor=ffcccc
| 2
| October 6
| Magnolia
| L 78–92
| Chris Newsome (18)
| Belo, Hugnatan (7)
| Chris Newsome (7)
| DHVSU Gym
| 0–2
|-bgcolor=ccffcc
| 3
| October 8
| Magnolia
| W 91–86
| Chris Newsome (17)
| Cliff Hodge (12)
| Newsome, Quinto (4)
| DHVSU Gym
| 1–2
|-bgcolor=ffcccc
| 4
| October 10
| Magnolia
| L 69–81
| Reynel Hugnatan (21)
| Reynel Hugnatan (9)
| Chris Newsome (8)
| DHVSU Gym
| 1–3
|-bgcolor=ccffcc
| 5
| October 13
| Magnolia
| W 102–98
| Allein Maliksi (29)
| Raymond Almazan (10)
| Chris Newsome (6)
| DHVSU Gym
| 2–3
|-bgcolor=ffcccc
| 6
| October 15
| Magnolia
| L 85–93
| Raymond Almazan (16)
| Raymond Almazan (12)
| Hodge, Newsome (6)
| DHVSU Gym
| 2–4

Governors' Cup

Eliminations

Standings

Game log

|-bgcolor=ccffcc
| 1
| December 16
| Blackwater
| W 98–77
| Tony Bishop (28)
| Tony Bishop (13)
| John Pinto (7)
| Smart Araneta Coliseum
| 1–0
|-bgcolor=ccffcc
| 2
| December 22
| TNT
| W 83–80
| Tony Bishop (36)
| Tony Bishop (17)
| Newsome, Pinto (4)
| Smart Araneta Coliseum
| 2–0

|-bgcolor=ccffcc
| 3
| February 11, 2022
| NLEX
| W 110–100
| Tony Bishop (32)
| Tony Bishop (13)
| Tony Bishop (8)
| Smart Araneta Coliseum
| 3–0
|-bgcolor=ccffcc
| 4
| February 13, 2022
| Barangay Ginebra
| W 101–95
| Tony Bishop (30)
| Tony Bishop (13)
| Bishop, Newsome (7)
| Smart Araneta Coliseum
| 4–0
|-bgcolor=ffcccc
| 5
| February 17, 2022
| NorthPort
| L 98–109
| Tony Bishop (34)
| Tony Bishop (16)
| Chris Newsome (8)
| Smart Araneta Coliseum
| 4–1
|-bgcolor=ccffcc
| 6
| February 20, 2022
| Rain or Shine
| W 93–88
| Tony Bishop (26)
| Tony Bishop (14)
| Chris Banchero (5)
| Smart Araneta Coliseum3,347
| 5–1
|-bgcolor=ccffcc
| 7
| February 24, 2022
| Terrafirma
| W 107–95
| Tony Bishop (26)
| Tony Bishop (11)
| Allein Maliksi (6)
| Ynares Center
| 6–1
|-bgcolor=ffcccc
| 8
| February 26, 2022
| Alaska
| L 93–94
| Allein Maliksi (32)
| Tony Bishop (13)
| Tony Bishop (5)
| Ynares Center
| 6–2

|-bgcolor=ffcccc
| 9
| March 2, 2022
| Magnolia
| L 85–88
| Tony Bishop (19)
| Tony Bishop (14)
| Chris Newsome (5)
| Smart Araneta Coliseum
| 6–3
|-bgcolor=ffcccc
| 10
| March 5, 2022
| San Miguel
| L 110–115
| Tony Bishop (29)
| Tony Bishop (14)
| Chris Newsome (7)
| Smart Araneta Coliseum
| 6–4
|-bgcolor=ccffcc
| 11
| March 11, 2022
| Phoenix
| W 109–90
| Tony Bishop (35)
| Tony Bishop (13)
| Tony Bishop (5)
| Smart Araneta Coliseum
| 7–4

Playoffs

Bracket

Game log

|-bgcolor=ccffcc
| 1
| March 18, 2022
| San Miguel
| W 100–85
| Tony Bishop (32)
| Tony Bishop (16)
| Bong Quinto (5)
| Smart Araneta Coliseum
| 1–0

|-bgcolor=ffcccc
| 1
| March 23, 2022
| Magnolia
| L 80–94
| Chris Banchero (16)
| Tony Bishop (12)
| Bong Quinto (4)
| SM Mall of Asia Arena
| 0–1
|-bgcolor=ccffcc
| 2
| March 25, 2022
| Magnolia
| W 81–75
| Tony Bishop (22)
| Tony Bishop (14)
| Aaron Black (4)
| SM Mall of Asia Arena
| 1–1
|-bgcolor=ccffcc
| 3
| March 27, 2022
| Magnolia
| W 101–95
| Tony Bishop (27)
| Tony Bishop (10)
| Banchero, Newsome (5)
| SM Mall of Asia Arena13,272
| 2–1
|-bgcolor=ffcccc
| 4
| March 30, 2022
| Magnolia
| L 73–94
| Tony Bishop (22)
| Tony Bishop (16)
| Chris Newsome (5)
| Smart Araneta Coliseum10,353
| 2–2
|-bgcolor=ccffcc
| 5
| April 1, 2022
| Magnolia
| W 94–81
| Allein Maliksi (24)
| Bishop, Newsome (8)
| Chris Newsome (12)
| Smart Araneta Coliseum
| 3–2

|-bgcolor=ccffcc
| 1
| April 6, 2022
| Barangay Ginebra
| W 104–91
| Allein Maliksi (22)
| Tony Bishop (12)
| Chris Newsome (7)
| Smart Araneta Coliseum12,457
| 1–0
|-bgcolor=ffcccc
| 2
| April 8, 2022
| Barangay Ginebra
| L 93–99
| Tony Bishop (31)
| Tony Bishop (13)
| Aaron Black (6)
| SM Mall of Asia Arena12,248 
| 1–1
|-bgcolor=ccffcc
| 3
| April 10, 2022
| Barangay Ginebra
| W 83–74
| Tony Bishop (30)
| Tony Bishop (16)
| Chris Newsome (6)
| SM Mall of Asia Arena16,104
| 2–1
|-bgcolor=ffcccc
| 4
| April 13, 2022
| Barangay Ginebra
| L 84–95
| Tony Bishop (25)
| Almazan, Black (9)
| Chris Newsome (5)
| Smart Araneta Coliseum17,298 
| 2–2
|-bgcolor=ffcccc
| 5
| April 17, 2022
| Barangay Ginebra
| L 110–115
| Tony Bishop (30)
| Tony Bishop (15)
| Black, Newsome (5)
| Smart Araneta Coliseum18,251 
| 2–3
|-bgcolor=ffcccc
| 6
| April 22, 2022
| Barangay Ginebra
| L 92–103
| Tony Bishop (21)
| Tony Bishop (16)
| Chris Newsome (6)
| SM Mall of Asia Arena20,224
| 2–4

Transactions

Trades

Pre-season

Mid-season

Recruited imports

References

Meralco Bolts seasons
Meralco Bolts